USS Cowell (DD-547), a , was the second ship of the United States Navy to be named for John G. Cowell (1785–1814).

Cowell was launched 18 March 1943 by Bethlehem Steel Co., San Pedro, California, sponsored by Mrs. R. Hepburn; and commissioned 23 August 1943.

Central Pacific campaigns 

Sailing from San Pedro 28 October 1943, Cowell arrived at Pearl Harbor 2 November to join the Fast Carrier Task Force (then TF 58, later TF 38). From 10 November to 13 December she screened the carriers as they launched air attacks during the invasion of the Gilbert Islands, then sailed from Espiritu Santo for strikes on Kavieng, New Ireland at the turn of the year; and on Kwajalein, Ebeye, and Eniwetok Islands at the close of January. Returning to Majuro, she put to sea for the strike on Truk of 16 and 17 February 1944, then sailed to Pearl Harbor to replenish.

Cowell returned to Majuro 22 March 1944 and rejoined TF 58 for the strikes on Palau, Yap and Ulithi of 30 March to 1 April; the invasion of Hollandia from 21 to 23 April; and the raids on Truk, Satawan and Ponape of 29 April to 1 May. After the air attacks on Marcus Island and Wake Island from 19 to 23 May, Cowell continued to screen the carriers during the Marianas operation. She sortied from her base at Majuro from 6 June to 14 July for strikes on Guam and Rota, raids to neutralize Japanese bases in the Bonins, and to give protective antiaircraft cover for the carriers in the Battle of the Philippine Sea on 19 and 20 June.

After an overhaul at Eniwetok, Cowell put to sea 29 August 1944 with Task Group 36.5 (TG 38.5) for air strikes on the western Carolines, the Philippines and the Palaus, and the Manila and Subic Bay area, as well as to support the landings on Morotai on 15 September. She arrived at Manus on 28 September to replenish, then sortied 2 October supporting air strikes on Okinawa, Luzon, and Formosa preparing for the Leyte assault. She rejoined her task force to sail for the far-flung Battle for Leyte Gulf, and aircraft from her carriers were in time to launch telling strikes against the retreating Japanese ships. Cowell returned to Ulithi 28 October for patrol and training duty until 26 December when she sailed for Seattle and an overhaul.

Battle of Okinawa 

Returning to action, Cowell sailed from Saipan 27 March 1945 for the invasion of Okinawa. She covered the diversionary landings during the assault on 1 April, then took up the radar picket duty which was to bring her a Presidential Unit Citation (US). Until 20 June Cowell braved the hazards of the picket line to direct combat air patrol successfully and to shoot down her own share of Japanese aircraft with antiaircraft fire. On at least three occasions skillful maneuvering, accurate fire and courage saved Cowell from severe damage. On 4 May she shot down two planes within 50 feet of the ship, receiving a shower of gasoline and burning debris, then aided  by firing on another kamikaze. On 13 May Cowell fired on several attacking planes, then brought firefighting and medical assistance to the stricken , screening her from further attack. In another attack on 25 May Cowell shot down a diving kamikaze which exploded in midair scattering shell fragments and its cockpit door on Cowells deck and causing small fires. Relieved of picket duty 20 June, Cowell joined TG 32.15 to patrol off Okinawa in the East China Sea. On 22 July she sent rescue and fire-fighting parties to aid .

Cowell sailed from Okinawa 20 September 1945 to support the occupation landings at Matsuyama. She cleared for home from Nagoya 31 October and arrived at San Diego 17 November, where Cowell was placed out of commission in reserve 22 July 1946.

 1951 – 1960 

Recommissioned 21 September 1951, Cowell was assigned to the Atlantic Fleet, and sailed from San Diego 4 January 1952 to arrive at Norfolk, Virginia 19 January. She joined in fleet exercises and training, then sailed from Norfolk 7 January 1953 for the Far East. She joined TF 77 off Korea on patrol, then operated with British ships in the West Coast Blockade Force. She escorted  to a bombardment of the east coast of Korea, then joined TG 95.2 for shore bombardment in Wonsan Harbor, minesweeping and coastal patrols. She cleared Sasebo 26 June to complete her cruise around the world calling at Manila, and passing through the Indian Ocean, the Suez Canal and the Mediterranean Sea to return to Norfolk 22 August. From 4 September to 23 November she conducted local hunter-killer exercises, then cruised the Atlantic and Mediterranean for like operations from 4 January to 11 March 1954.

Cowell cleared Norfolk 7 January 1955 and arrived at Long Beach 28 January to join the Pacific Fleet. Cowell returned to the Far East for similar duty annually through 1960, joining in exercises and training from Long Beach when not deployed.

 ARA Almirante Storni 

On 17 August 1971, the ship was decommissioned, stricken from the U.S. Naval Vessel Register, and transferred to Argentina. She served in the Argentine Navy as ARA Almirante Storni'''.

In October 1975, the British Government tasked Lord Shackleton (son of the Antarctic explorer Sir Ernest Shackleton) with an economic survey of the Falkland Islands. The Argentine Government reacted furiously and refused permission for Shackleton to travel via Argentina.
In 1982, she was stricken and scrapped.

In addition to the Presidential Unit Citation, Cowell'' received 11 battle stars for World War II service and two for Korean War service.

References

External links 

       navsource.org: USS Cowell
 hazegray.org: USS Cowell

 

Fletcher-class destroyers of the United States Navy
Ships built in Los Angeles
1943 ships
World War II destroyers of the United States
Cold War destroyers of the United States
Korean War destroyers of the United States
Almirante Storni
Cold War destroyers of Argentina